Jack Gross Jr. (February 4, 1929 – December 14, 2007) was an American film screenwriter and television situation comedy writer.

Biography
Gross was born in Fort Worth, Texas. His father, Jack O. Gross, founded KFMB-TV, the first television station in San Diego in May 1949. His brother Laurence Gross was an entertainment critic on KNSD.

He wrote the screenplays for Clay Pigeon and Welcome to Arrow Beach (1974). On television, he wrote episodes of Gilligan's Island, Diff'rent Strokes and My Favorite Martian."Man in Rolls Hails from Hollywood" (14 March 2001), The Press-Enterprise, page B2

He graduated Point Loma High School in 1947. He was a graduate of San Fernando Valley State College, now known as CSUN, and the USC School of Cinematic Arts.  Gross died of heart failure in La Jolla, California.

His son is Josh E. Gross, publisher of Beverly Hills Weekly''.

References

1929 births
2007 deaths
People from Fort Worth, Texas
American male screenwriters
American television writers
American comedy writers
American male television writers
Screenwriters from Texas
20th-century American male writers
20th-century American screenwriters